The Canadian Airborne Forces Association (CAFA) is the umbrella organization for all military airborne associations within Canada. CAFA membership is open to all qualified Canadian military parachutists, as well as military parachutists from Allied countries. Associate membership is available to non-jump qualified applicants, considered on a case-by-case basis.

Membership
Current membership mainly consists of former members of airborne regiments, such as the Canadian Airborne Regiment and The Queen's Own Rifles of Canada.

Branches
CAFA currently has 8 branches across Canada.

Branch #1 - Toronto
Branch #4 - Cambridge
Branch #7 - London
Branch #8 - Chilliwack
Branch #9 - Kingston
Branch #13 - Barrie (Huronia)
Branch #15 - Montreal
Branch #16 - Nova Scotia

Activities
CAFA publishes a magazine, The Maroon Beret, once a year. It is billed as "the Journal of the Canadian Airborne Brotherhood".

CAFA also hosts an Annual Airborne Luncheon at the Royal Canadian Military Institute in Toronto, Ontario.

See also

Canadian Sport Parachuting Association

External

Canadian Airborne Forces Association

Parachuting in Canada
Parachuting organizations
Canadian veterans' organizations
Canada